Various research and polling firms conducted opinion polling prior to the 2016 federal election in individual electorates across Australia, in relation to voting intentions in the Australian House of Representatives.

New South Wales

Victoria

Queensland

Western Australia

South Australia

Tasmania

Northern Territory

References
Notes

Citations

Opinion polling, electorate
2016
Australia